JNA may refer to:

Medicine
 Juvenile nasopharyngeal angiofibroma

Transport
 Januaria Airport (IATA: JNA), an airport in Minas Gerais, Brazil
 Jinair (ICAO: JNA), a subsidiary of Korean Air
 Jinan railway station, China Railway pinyin code JNA

Organisations
 Japanese Nursing Association
 JNA Stadium, later Partizan stadium, Belgrade, Serbia
 Yugoslav People's Army (Jugoslovenska narodna armija)

Other
 Java Native Access, a Java software library
 JNA Wireless Association, an amateur radio organization based in Mumbai, India
 Jna., a formerly common abbreviation of the given name Jonathan

See also
 GNA (disambiguation)
 Gina (disambiguation)
 Jina (disambiguation)
 Jinnah (disambiguation)